The LK is an experimental indie band from Malmö, Sweden. LK is short for the Lovekevins, the band's name before the 2008 USA release of Vs. the Snow, and shortened from their first band name, The Love of Kevin, Colour, Chaos and the Sound of K.

The band is a duo of Lindefelt, a sound artist, and Fredrik, a songwriter. Both perform solo and also run a microlabel called POL. They play melodic, electronic indie rock built from unlikely instrumental takes, noise and chunks of acoustic sound.  They have been mentioned in Spin, Stereogum, Pitchfork Media and elsewhere, and have toured in Sweden, Norway, Germany, England and the United States. 

Their album, Vs. the Snow, was released in 2007  and in the US on March 4, 2008.

Discography

Albums 
 Vs. the Snow (2007)  Songs I Wish I Had Written / The Kora Records

EPs 
 Max Léon (2005) Songs I Wish I Had Written
 Blame the English (2005) Songs I Wish I Had Written
 Private Life of a Cat (2006) Songs I Wish I Had Written

References

External links
Official web site

Swedish rock music groups